The Art Gallery of Alberta (AGA) is an art museum in Edmonton, Alberta, Canada. The museum occupies a  building at Churchill Square in downtown Edmonton. The museum building was originally designed by Donald G. Bittorf, and B. James Wensley, although portions of that structure were demolished or built over during a redevelopment of the building by Randall Stout.

The art museum was established in 1924 as the Edmonton Museum of Arts. In 1956 the museum was renamed the Edmonton Art Gallery. The museum occupied a number of location from its establishment in 1924 to 1969. The museum was relocated to its present location and reopened to the public in 1969 at the Brutalist Arthur Blow Condell building. In 2005, the museum was renamed Art Gallery of Alberta. From 2007 to 2010, the art museum underwent a  redevelopment of its building. The redeveloped building was reopened to the public on January 31, 2010.

Its collection includes over 6,000 works, with a focus on art produced in Alberta, and other parts of western Canada. In addition to exhibiting its permanent collection, the museum also hosts travelling exhibitions and offers public education programs.

History 
The museum was established in 1924 as the Edmonton Museum of Arts, with a mandate to promote fine arts, and preserve historical relics from the region. The institution was established after Maud Bowman, the museums founding director and president enlisted the support of the Edmonton Art Club, and several other business, and political leaders.

The museum held its first exhibition in the Palm Room of the Hotel Macdonald, with work on loan from local collections that included members of the Edmonton Art Club in addition to 24 works on loan from the National Gallery of Canada collection. Growth of the museum's collection was slowed during the 1930s and 1940s, as a result of the Great Depression and the Second World War. During this period, the museum maintained a number of art education classes, as well as exhibiting works on loan from the National Gallery of Canada.

In the first half of the 20th century, the museum occupied various sites including a former Edmonton Public Library building, and the fourth floor of the Civic Block and the Edmonton Motors; building before settling into the former home of Richard Secord in 1952. Recognizing that the majority of its collection, and exhibition activities were in the area of fine arts, the institution opted to change its name to the Edmonton Art Gallery in 1956.

Efforts to construct a purpose-built facility for the art museum began in 1962, after A. E. Condell bequeathed funds to the museum on behalf of her son, Arthur Blow Condell. Designs by architects Donald G. Bittorf, and B. James Wensley were chosen for the building, with the City of Edmonton donating  at Churchill Square for the site of the new building. The building was opened in 1969, and was named the "Arthur Blow Condell Memorial Building". Further renovations to the building in 1977 saw the creation a new wing, replacing an exterior courtyard.

Proposals to renovate the building were made in June 1998, although serious discussions about its funding did not begin until 2001. In 2005, the museum launched an architectural competition, with 27 architects submitting applications. In September 2005, the designs from Los Angeles-based architect Randall Stout was chosen as the winning design for the museum. The redevelopment doubles the exhibition space within its structure, as well as provided an off-site storage site for its collection. On the same day the winning design was announced, the museum was renamed the Art Gallery of Alberta, in an effort to reflect its expanding focus on art from all of Alberta.

In April 2007, the Arthur Blow Condell building was partially demolished with significant portions of the existing structure incorporated into Stout's design. Construction of the new building formally began in June 2007. The museum was closed to the public from March 2007 to January 2010 in order to facilitate the construction of the new building; with a museum exhibiting its collection in a former Hudson's Bay Company property at Enterprise Square from April 2007 to December 2009. The museum's inaugural exhibitions after the renovation included: Edgar Degas: Figures in Motion; Karsh: Image Maker; and The Murder of Crows, the North American premiere of Janet Cardiff and George Bures Miller's sound installation. After the museum reopened on 31 January 2010, annual memberships to the Art Gallery of Alberta increased, with the museum seeing 30,000 visitors within the first six weeks of reopening.

In December 2009, the museum and the National Gallery of Canada issued a joint press release announcing a three-year partnership, which saw the use of the Art Gallery of Alberta's galleries to exhibit works from the National Gallery's collection. The program was the first "satellite program" between the National Gallery of Canada, and another art museum.

In 2017, the museum started an initiative of providing free admission for minors and post-secondary students.

Grounds

The property is located at Churchill Square, a public square in downtown Edmonton.

Building
The building was designed by Randall Stouts Architects, Inc., from Los Angeles and San Francisco. Local architects and engineering firms HIP Architects, Stantec, BPTEC Engineering, and Read Jones Christoffersen assisted Randall Stout's design team; while Ledcor Group of Companies provided construction management for the project.

The patinated zinc and stainless steel design was intended to demonstrate the museum's "commitment to contemporary art". The exterior of the building features a  steel ribbon, intended to represent the North Saskatchewan River, and the aurora, geographical phenomenons and features of Edmonton. The building's interior also features an "aurora" inspired room. The building includes a restaurant, espresso bar, gift shop, and an educational facility with a 150-seat theatre known as the Singhmar Centre for Art Education. The building includes a rooftop patio known as the City of Edmonton Terrace. The building also includes rental spaces for the public, such as Manning Hall.

The original structure on the property that was used by the museum, the Arthur Blow Condell building, was opened in 1969 with designs from Donald G. Bittorf, and B. James Wensley. The Brutalist-styled building was partially demolished in 2007 to accommodate the reconstruction of the building. However, approximately 67 per cent of the older museum structure was retained during the reconstruction, with most of the retained portions used as the new building's foundation, or lower floors. The new building's third-floor terrace was the roof of the Arthur Blow Condell building. 

The museum building was designed to be accessible with automatic doors and provides wheelchairs upon request, and free admission for accompanying care workers. The museum also operates an "equity committee" that serves to identify barriers rooted in ableism, racism, or exclusion; and advises the museum's board of directors and facility management on practice and changes.

Transit access
The museum is accessible through public transit from Churchill station, a station for the Edmonton Light Rail Transit system. The museum provides a discount visitors who travelled by public transit. Parking spaces for automobiles and bicycles is not provided by the museum, with museum visitors reliant on surrounding parking spaces maintained by the municipal government.

Permanent collection

The museum's permanent collection features over 6,000 works, the majority of which were produced after the 1950s. Many of these works were acquired by the museum through private and public donors. The museum's collection has an emphasis on art that was produced in Alberta, or western Canada. The museum's permanent collection began in 1924, although its growth was slowed during the 1930s and 1940s as a result of the Great Depression and the Second World War. From the 1960s to the 1985, the museum's focused its acquisition efforts on paintings and sculptures of modern art. In 2017, the museum received $375,000 to acquire works by contemporary First Nations, Inuit and Metis artists for their permanent collection from the Canada Council for the Arts' New Chapter program.

The museum's collection of historical Canadian art includes works by Jack Bush, Emily Carr, Henry George Glyde, Illingworth Kerr, Cornelius Krieghoff, Pegi Nicol MacLeod, James Wilson Morrice, Marion Nicoll, Paul Peel, Bill Reid, Jean-Paul Riopelle, Carl Schaefer, Lilias Torrance Newton, and members of the Group of Seven.

The museum's collection of modern and contemporary art feature works by Canadian artists including Robert Boyer, Janet Cardiff, Chris Cran, Marlene Creates, Dean Drever, Aganetha Dyck, Douglas Haynes, Alex Janvier, Brian Jungen, Rita Letendre, Amy Malbeuf, Liz Magor, Lyndal Osborne, Jane Ash Poitras, and Takao Tanabe.

The museum's collection of photographs was started in 1977 and presently has over 1,500 photographs. The museum's collection of photographs includes historical photographs by Edward Curtis, Karl Blossfeldt, Walker Evans, and Yousuf Karsh, and contemporary photographs by Lynne Cohen, and William Eakin. The museum also maintains a prints collection that includes over 850 works by Thomas Bewick.

Selected works

Affiliations
The museum is affiliated with the Alberta Museum Association, the Canadian Heritage Information Network, the Canadian Museums Association, and the Virtual Museum of Canada.

See also
 List of art museums
 List of museums in Alberta

Notes

References

Further reading

External links

Museums in Edmonton
Art museums and galleries in Alberta
Art museums established in 1924
Postmodern architecture in Canada
Art galleries established in 1924
1924 establishments in Alberta